Thein Tun (also spelt Thein Htun; born 5 December 1947) is a retired Burmese Major-general and politician, serving as the Minister for Posts and Telecommunications of Myanmar. In the 2010 Burmese general election, he won a Pyithu Hluttaw seat after contesting the constituency of Myaing Township. He was resigned on 16 January 2013.

Family
Thein Tun was born to parents U Pywat and Daw Phayaon, who have 5 children together.

References

1947 births
People from Magway Division
Union Solidarity and Development Party politicians
Burmese military personnel
Government ministers of Myanmar
Living people